The 2017 Nigeria Professional Football League was the 46th season of the top Nigerian professional league for association football clubs, since its establishment in 1972, and the 27th since the rebranding of the league as the "Professional League". 
Plateau United won the league on the Saturday, 9 September 2017 with a 2-0 victory over Enugu Rangers.

Enugu Rangers won the previous edition, their seventh league title and first since 1984.

Plateau United's win of this edition is their first ever title, which came in their second season after being promoted to the top flight. It was intended to be rational, meaning in reserve purposes.

Clubs
A total of 20 teams contested the league, these included 16 teams from the previous season and four teams promoted from the Nigeria National League. The season began on 14 January.

League table

Season statistics

Goals

Top scorers

Hat-tricks

References

Nigeria Professional Football League seasons
2016–17 in African association football leagues
2016–17 in Nigerian football